Joely Rodríguez Sánchez (born November 14, 1991) is a Dominican professional baseball pitcher for the Boston Red Sox of Major League Baseball (MLB). He has previously played in MLB for the Philadelphia Phillies, Texas Rangers, New York Yankees, and New York Mets, and in Nippon Professional Baseball (NPB) for the Chunichi Dragons.

Career

Pittsburgh Pirates
Rodríguez signed with the Pittsburgh Pirates for a $55,000 signing bonus in March 2009. He spent the 2009 season with the DSL Pirates, going 2–5 with a 4.60 ERA over 47 innings. 

He split the 2010 season between the GCL Pirates and the State College Spikes, going a combined 2–2 with a 4.21 ERA over  innings. He spent the 2011 season (most of which he missed with an elbow stress reaction and appendicitis) and 2012 season back with State College. He split the 2013 season between the West Virginia Power and the Bradenton Marauders, going a combined 9–8 with a 2.70 ERA over 140 innings. He was added to the team's 40-man roster on November 20, 2013. He spent the 2014 season with the Altoona Curve, going 6–11 with a 4.84 ERA over 134 innings.

Philadelphia Phillies
On December 10, 2014, the Pirates traded Rodríguez to the Philadelphia Phillies in exchange for Antonio Bastardo. He split the 2015 season between the Reading Fightin Phils and Lehigh Valley IronPigs, going a combined 7–10 with a 6.12 ERA over  innings. He split the 2016 minor league season between the Clearwater Threshers, Reading, and LeHigh Valley, going a combined 7–0 with a 2.35 ERA over  innings. He made his major league debut on September 11, 2016. He produced a 2.79 ERA over 9 innings for the Phillies in 2016. In 2017, he posted a 1–2 record with a 6.33 ERA over 27 innings for the Phillies.

Texas Rangers
On June 13, 2017, Rodríguez was traded to the Texas Rangers in exchange for cash considerations or a player to be named later. He spent the remainder of the 2017 season with the Round Rock Express, posting a 2–0 record with a 6.33 ERA over 27 innings.

Baltimore Orioles
On November 28, 2017, Rodríguez signed a minor league contract with the Baltimore Orioles. He opened the 2018 season with the Norfolk Tides, going 5–2 with a 4.56 ERA over  innings. On July 19, 2018, Rodríguez opted out of his minor league contract, making him a free agent.

Chunichi Dragons
On July 25, 2018, Rodríguez signed with the Chunichi Dragons of Nippon Professional Baseball on a $270,000 contract. On September 15, 2018, Rodríguez  broke the NPB velocity record for a southpaw pitcher throwing down a  pitch against the Hiroshima Carp previously beating the  record set by Yusei Kikuchi in 2016. He produced a 0–3 record with a 2.30 ERA over  innings in 2018.

Rodríguez re-signed with the Dragons for the 2019 season. He posted a 3–4 record with a 1.64 ERA and 77 strikeouts in  innings in 2019. On December 2, 2019, he become free agent.

Texas Rangers (second stint)
Rodríguez signed a two-year contract, with a team option, with the Texas Rangers on December 16, 2019. In his first season with Texas, he registered an ERA of 2.13 in 12 games.

In 2021 he was 1-3 with a 5.93 ERA.

New York Yankees
On July 29, 2021, the Rangers traded Rodríguez and Joey Gallo to the New York Yankees for Josh Smith, Glenn Otto, Trevor Hauver, and Ezequiel Duran. He pitched to a 1–0 record and a 2.84 ERA in 21 appearances for the Yankees. In total in the 2021 season, he was 2-3 with a 4.66 ERA. After the 2021 season, the Yankees declined his $3 million option for the 2022 season, but signed him to a contract for $2 million.

New York Mets
On April 3, 2022, the Yankees traded Rodríguez to the New York Mets for Miguel Castro. On April 29, 2022, Rodríguez pitched in relief in a combined no-hitter against the Philadelphia Phillies, pitching 1 inning. He ranked in the 95th percentile for average exit velocity, 95th percentile for barrel percentage, and 94th percentile for chase rate in 2022. He was 2-4 with a 4.47 ERA.

Boston Red Sox
On November 23, 2022, the Boston Red Sox signed Rodríguez to a one-year contract with a club option for the 2024 season.

References

External links

NPB Stats

1991 births
Living people
Altoona Curve players
Bradenton Marauders players
Chunichi Dragons players
Clearwater Threshers players
Dominican Republic expatriate baseball players in Japan
Dominican Republic expatriate baseball players in the United States
Dominican Summer League Pirates players
Gigantes del Cibao players
Gulf Coast Pirates players
Lehigh Valley IronPigs players
Major League Baseball pitchers
Major League Baseball players from the Dominican Republic
New York Mets players
New York Yankees players
Nippon Professional Baseball pitchers
Philadelphia Phillies players
Reading Fightin Phils players
Round Rock Express players
Scottsdale Scorpions players
Sportspeople from Santo Domingo
State College Spikes players
Texas Rangers players
West Virginia Power players